Hilary Tham (August 20, 1946 – June 24, 2005), also known as Hilary Tham Goldberg,  was a Malaysian-born American poet. Tham studied English literature in Malaysia before marrying an American Peace Corps worker. She then converted to Judaism and immigrated to the U.S. Tham published many books of poetry and was editor-in-chief for the nonprofit poetry publishing house, Word Works.

Biography 
The daughter of Chinese immigrants, Hilary Tham was born in Klang, Malaysia. She attended a convent school run by Irish nuns, a Catholic school run by Dominican friars, and a prep school in Kuala Lumpur. She received her bachelor's degree in English literature from the University of Malaya in 1969. She converted to Judaism after marrying Jewish-American Peace Corps worker, Joseph Goldberg, in Malaysia. In 1971, the couple immigrated to the United States, first settling in New Jersey and then moving to Arlington, Virginia two years later. She chaired the Northern Virginia Coalition, a nonprofit organization that helped to resettle Vietnamese refugees, and served as sisterhood president at her synagogue, which is now the Congregation Etz Hayim in Arlington. Tham was editor-in-chief for Word Works, a nonprofit poetry publishing house, and was poetry editor for the Potomac Review. She taught creative writing at various nearby schools, including Yorktown High School and Williamsburg Middle School, and was an Oriental brush painter. She died in Arlington at the age of 58 from metastatic lung cancer.

Tham reflected upon both Asian and American culture in her work. She has been categorized as a "Chinese-Malaysian writer with Judaic influences." Two of her books have appeared in the curriculum of the University of Pittsburgh.

Legacy
In 2005, Word Works renamed their Capital Collection the Hilary Tham Capital Collection in her honor.

Awards and honors 
Tham's collection of poems, Bad Names for Women, won second prize in the 1988 Virginia Poetry Prizes and the 1990 Paterson Poetry Prize. Tin Mines and Concubines received the Washington Writers Publishing House Prize.

Selected works

Poetry
 No Gods Today. 1969. 
 Bad Names for Women. 1989. .
 Tigerbone Wine (Poems). 1992. .
 Paper Boats: Poems. 1993.
 Men & Other Strange Myths: Poems and Art. 1994. .
 Counting: A Long Poem. 2000. .
 Reality Check & Other Travel Poems & Art. 2001. .
 The Tao of Mrs. Wei. 2003. .

Memoir
 Lane With No Name: Memoirs and Poems of a Malaysian-Chinese Girlhood. 1997. .

Short story  
 Tin Mines and Concubines. 2005. .

References

Further reading 
Faye Moskowitz, ed. Her Face in the Mirror: Jewish Women on Mothers and Daughters. Beacon Press. 1995. . p. 142.
Rocío G. Davis. Begin Here: Reading Asian North American Autobiographies of Childhood. University of Hawaii Press. 2007. . p 51.

External links 
 

Malaysian poets
Malaysian short story writers
American women poets
American short story writers
1946 births
2005 deaths
Malaysian people of Chinese descent
Malaysian women writers
Malaysian women poets
Malaysian women short story writers
American poets
American writers of Chinese descent
Malaysian emigrants to the United States
Converts to Judaism
Malaysian Jews
20th-century American Jews
Deaths from lung cancer
20th-century Malaysian people
20th-century American poets
21st-century American poets
21st-century short story writers
20th-century American women writers
21st-century American women writers
20th-century Malaysian women writers
21st-century Malaysian women writers
20th-century Malaysian writers
21st-century Malaysian writers
University of Malaya alumni
21st-century American Jews